The Wodonga Saints Football Netball Club is an Australian rules football and netball club playing their home games at Martin Park in Wodonga, Victoria, Australia.

Originally established as the Bethanga Football Club in 1907, with the club was based at the Bethanga Park Recreation Reserve, Bethanga, Victoria, Australia up until 2001.

Following the 1999 Victorian Country Football League report that stated a number of clubs, including Bethanga, were on the verge of collapsing if some kind of action was not taken. After playing a handful of matches at Wodonga's Martin Park to see if there would be enough local support to support the club moving there, the club made the decision in 2002 and Bethanga FC relocated fully to Martin Park, Wodonga & were renamed as the Wodonga Saints Football Club.

History

Bethanga Football Club
The Bethanga Football Club was established in 1907 and initially played in the Mitta Mitta Football League (Tallangatta Football Association) with its first match against Tallangatta Football Club at home at Bethanga Park in the black and red (Essendon) colors.

Local brothers, Arthur Mills and Albert Mills played for Bethanga in the 1926 and 1927 Kiewa & District Football Association grand finals, before the family moved to Oxley, near Wangaratta, playing with Wangaratta Football Club in 1929, then both brothers made their debuts for the Hawthorn Football Club in 1930.

In 1928, Bethanga FC wore the colours of red, white and blue.

In 1958, Granya FC (who folded in 1954) and Bethanga FC merged to become the Granya / Bethanga Bombers and were coached by Norm Benstead, who happened to kick 100 plus goals in 1958. In 1959, the merged club changed its name to the Murray United Football Club and was coached by Alf Deane. Unfortunately for the local community the new club folded after the 1959 season, after winning only one game and forfeiting two. Granya FC would never reform and the Bethanga FC would not reform until the 1976 Tallangatta & District Football League season.

Football Competitions Timeline
Bethanga Football Club have played in the following football competitions.
1907 & 1908: Tallangatta Football Association
1909: Twomey Stewart Football Association
1910 to 1912: Club in recess.
1913: Mitta Mitta Valley Football League
1914: Wodonga & District Football Association
1915 to 1919: Club in recess due to World War I
1920 to 1921: Kiewa Football Association
1922 to 1923: Tallangatta & District Football Association
1924 to 1928: Kiewa & District Football Association  
1928: Yackandandah & District Football Association - B. Grade competition 
1929 to 1932: Yackandandah Football Association
1933: Tallangatta & District Football League
1934 to 1938: Hume Football League
1939: Dederang & District Football League 
1940: Kiewa & Mitta Football League 
1941 to 1944: Club in recess, due to World War II
1945 to 1955: Tallangatta & District Football League
1956: Chiltern & District Football Association
1957: Tallangatta & District Football League
1958: Granya / Bethanga Bombers FC - Tallangatta & District Football League
1959: Murray United Football Club - Tallangatta & District Football League
1960 to 1975: Club in recess
1976 to 2001: Bethanga FNC - Tallangatta & District Football League
2002 to 2020: Wodonga Saints FNC - Tallangatta & District Football League

Senior Football - Premierships
 Mitta Mitta Valley Football League
1913: Bethanga defeated Granya by one point. Granya claimed that this match was a draw and refused to hand over the premiership trophy. Bethanga were compelled to take legal action against Granya Football Club to obtain possession of the premiership trophy. The case was to be heard at the Bethanga Police Court on the Wednesday 8 October 1913. This premiership trophy is now on display at the Bethanga Hotel. 
 Yackandandah Football Association
1929 - Bethanga: 5.15 - 45 defeated Yackandandah: 4.7 - 31 

Senior Football - Runners Up
 Tallangatta & District Football Association
1922 - Tallangatta:9.8 - 62 defeated Bethanga: 3.5 - 23 
Kiewa & District Football Association
1926 - Bethanga: 7.11 - 53 defeated Granya: 5.10 - 40. Bethanga won the first grand final, but Granya as minor premiers had the right to challenge Bethanga to a "Challenge Grand Final".
1926 - Granya: 4.18 - 42 defeated Bethanga: 5.8 - 38  Granya won the 1926 premiership.
1927 - Granya: 8.12 - 60 defeated Bethanga: 3.1 - 19 
 Yackandandah Football Association
1930 - Kergunyah: 11.6 - 72 defeated Bethanga: 6.16 - 52 
1931 - Talgarno: 8.6 - 54 drew with Bethanga: 8.6 - 54. Drawn grand final.
1931 - Talgarno: 11.14 - 80 defeated Bethanga: 10.8 - 68. Grand final replay.
Hume Football League
1938 - Lavington: 17.23 - 125 defeated Bethanga: 5.6 - 36 
Tallangatta & District Football League
1991 - Holbrook: defeated Bethanga:

 Bethanga FC footballers who played senior VFL football.
 1927 - Clarrie Morelli - Collingwood 
 1930 - Arthur Mills - Hawthorn
 1930 - Bert Mills - Hawthorn
 1958 - Len Cottrell - Carlton

Wodonga Saints Football Netball Club
In 2002, the club decided to relocate to Martin Park, Wodonga in order to save the club from possibly folding.
2002–present: Tallangatta & District Football League

Back To Bethanga
Since 2009 the Wodonga Saints have moved one home match back to the old Bethanga Football Ground on four occasions. The move has been widely welcomed by both the football club & greater Bethanga community.

References

External links
 
 1938 - Bethanga FC team photo

Australian rules football clubs in Victoria (Australia)
Australian rules football clubs established in 1945
1945 establishments in Australia